Charter of Feminist Principles for African Feminists is a document by the African Women's Development Fund that was formulated during a 2006 gathering of African women feminists across the world in Accra, Ghana, to create baseline principles to address key definitions of African feminism and patriarchy.

References
African Feminist Charter: English, Français, Português, Wolof, Kiswahili, Arabic 
Women's rights instruments
Feminism in Africa